Zhang Zhi (died 192), courtesy name Boying, was a Chinese calligrapher during the Han Dynasty. Born in Jiuquan, Gansu, he was a pioneer of the modern cursive script, and was traditionally honored as the Sage of Cursive Script.  Furthermore, he is known as one of the Four Talented Calligraphers in Chinese calligraphy.

Biography
Despite the great fame he enjoyed in ancient times, no veritable works of Zhang Zhi's have survived. A catchphrase is attributed to him: "Too busy to write cursively", which shows that the execution of cursive script, though originally invented for the sake of time-saving, requires a tranquil frame of mind.

References

Bibliography 
 Zhong, Mingshan, ""Zhang Zhi". Encyclopedia of China (Arts Edition), 1st ed.

Han dynasty calligraphers
Year of birth unknown
192 deaths
Artists from Gansu
People from Jiuquan
2nd-century Chinese calligraphers